The following is a list of episodes of the television series Inspector Rex, which premiered on November 10, 1994 on ORF 1.

Series overview

Episodes

Season 1 (1994–95)

Season 2 (1995–96)

Season 3 (1996–97)

Season 4 (1998)

Season 5 (1999)

Season 6 (2000)

Season 7 (2001)

Season 8 (2002–03)

Season 9 (2003–04)

Season 10 (2004)

Season 11 (2008)

Season 12 (2009)

Season 13 (2011)

Season 14 (2013)

Season 15 (2013)

Season 16 (2014)

Season 17 (2014)

Season 18 (2015)

External links 

Lists of crime drama television series episodes